Anna Temesvári (born 24 February 1943) is a Hungarian former backstroke and freestyle swimmer. She competed in two events at the 1960 Summer Olympics. Temesvári was born in the Újpest district of Budapest.

References

1943 births
Living people
Hungarian female backstroke swimmers
Olympic swimmers of Hungary
Swimmers at the 1960 Summer Olympics
Swimmers from Budapest
20th-century Hungarian women
21st-century Hungarian women
Hungarian female freestyle swimmers